The Kasserine Dam was a Roman dam at Kasserine (ancient Cillium), Tunisia. The curved structure which dates to the 2nd century AD is variously classified as arch-gravity dam or gravity dam.

The dam consisted of a core of earth and rubble faced with mortared blocks of cut stone. The upstream face is vertical, while the downstream side steps down through six courses and then continues vertically for 3.8 m. The thickness at the crest is 4.9 m, and at the base 7.3 m.

See also 
List of Roman dams and reservoirs
Roman architecture
Roman engineering

Notes

References 

Dams in Tunisia
Ancient Roman dams
Arch-gravity dams